The Dominion of Lubowla, also known as the Dominion of Lubowla and Podoliniec,{{efn|Polish: dominium lubowlańsko-podolinieckie; Slovakian: Ľubovniansko-podolínske panstvo}} was an administrative division of the Eldership of Spisz, that until 1568 belonged to the Kingdom of Poland, and from 1569 to 1772, to the Crown of the Kingdom of Poland, Polish–Lithuanian Commonwealth. Since 1772, it belonged to the Szepes County, Kingdom of Hungary. Its capital was Stará Ľubovňa, and other important towns were Podolínec and Hniezdne.Encyklopédia Slovenska, Veda.

It was formed on 8 November 1412, during the Spiš Pledge, from the part of the Szepes County, that was pledged from the Kingdom of Hungary to the Kingdom of Poland. In 1569, after the formation of Polish–Lithuanian Commonwealth, it became a part of Lesser Poland Province, Crown of the Kingdom of Poland. The eldership got conquered by Habsburg monarchy between 1769 and 1770 and remained under occupation until 1772 when it was formally incorporated into the Szepes County, Kingdom of Hungary. After that, it existed as the seat until 1778, when it unified with the Province of 13 Spisz Towns, forming the Province of 16 Szepes Towns.

Citations

Notes

 References 

Bibliography
 Zuzanna Krempaská, Sixteen Scepus Towns from 1412 to 1876. Spišska Nova Vés, Spiš Museum. ISBN 9788085173062.
 Encyklopédia Slovenska, VEDA, Bratislava, 1980.
 Julia Radziszewska, Studia spiskie. Katowice. 1985.
 Terra Scepusiensis. Stan badań nad dziejami Spiszu''. Lewocza-Wrocław. 2003.

Dominion of Lubowla
Subdivisions of the Polish–Lithuanian Commonwealth
Dominion of Lubowla
Dominion of Lubowla
Dominion of Lubowla
15th-century establishments in Poland
18th-century disestablishments in Poland
States and territories established in 1412
States and territories disestablished in 1778